Lozenge or losange may refer to:
Lozenge (shape), a type of rhombus
Throat lozenge, a tablet intended to be dissolved slowly in the mouth to suppress throat ailments
Lozenge (heraldry), a diamond-shaped object that can be placed on the field of a shield
Les films du losange, a film production company
Lauzinaj, also called Lozenge, an Arab sweet